This is a list of United States television stations which broadcast using the ATSC 3.0 standard, branded as "NextGen TV".

References 

 United States
ATSC 3.0
ATSC 3.0